Ram Pyare Panika is an Indian politician. He was elected to the Lok Sabha the lower house of Indian Parliament from Robertsganj in Uttar Pradesh  as a member of the Indian National Congress .

References

External links
 Official biographical sketch in Parliament of India website 

India MPs 1980–1984
India MPs 1984–1989
Lok Sabha members from Uttar Pradesh
1935 births
1999 deaths
Indian National Congress politicians from Uttar Pradesh